The 2021–22 season was the 123rd season in the existence of FC Bayern Munich and the club's 57th consecutive season in the top flight of German football. In addition to the domestic league, Bayern Munich participated in this season's editions of the DFB-Pokal and the UEFA Champions League, as well as the DFL-Supercup as winners of the 2020–21 Bundesliga.

This season was the first since 2010-11 without defender Jérôme Boateng who departed to join Olympique Lyonnais, 2008-09 without David Alaba who also left to join Real Madrid, and 2011-12 without fellow spaniard Javi Martínez who departed to join Qatar SC after he decided not to extend his contract to continue to play for the club.

Players

Squad

Other players with first-team appearances

Out on loan

Transfers

In

Out

Pre-season and friendlies

Competitions

Overall record

Bundesliga

League table

Results summary

Results by round

Matches
The league fixtures were announced on 25 June 2021.

DFB-Pokal

DFL-Supercup

UEFA Champions League

Group stage

The draw for the group stage was held on 26 August 2021.

Knockout phase

Round of 16
The draw for the round of 16 was held on 13 December 2021.

Quarter-finals
The draw for the quarter-finals was held on 18 March 2022.

Statistics

Appearances and goals

|-
! colspan="18" style=background:#dcdcdc; text-align:center| Goalkeepers 
 
 

|-
! colspan="18" style=background:#dcdcdc; text-align:center| Defenders 

 

 

|-
! colspan="18" style=background:#dcdcdc; text-align:center| Midfielders  
 
 

|-
! colspan="18" style=background:#dcdcdc; text-align:center| Forwards 

 
 

|-
! colspan="18" style=background:#dcdcdc; text-align:center| Players transferred out during the season 
 

|-

Goalscorers

Notes

References

FC Bayern Munich seasons
Bayern Munich
Bayern Munich
German football championship-winning seasons